Handful of Soul is the fourteenth studio album by American musician James Brown. The album was released in November 1966, by Smash Records.

Track listing

References

1966 albums
James Brown albums
Albums produced by James Brown
Smash Records albums